Kentucky's 3rd congressional district is a congressional district in the U.S. state of Kentucky.  It encompasses almost all of Louisville Metro, which, since the merger of 2003, is consolidated with Jefferson County, though other incorporated cities exist within the county, such as Shively and St. Matthews. The far eastern reaches of Louisville Metro are part of the 2nd congressional district.

The district is currently represented by Democrat Morgan McGarvey. With a Cook Partisan Voting Index rating of D+9, it is the only Democratic district in Kentucky.

Characteristics
The district's character is very different from the rest of Kentucky. It is entirely contained within Jefferson County, and in contrast to the rest of the state, it is urban and leans Democratic. It has the highest percentage of African Americans in the state, who are concentrated in and near Louisville. It is a cosmopolitan, diverse district, with major businesses, health care organizations and universities.

Until January 1, 2006, Kentucky did not track party affiliation for registered voters who were neither Democratic nor Republican. The Kentucky voter registration card does not explicitly list anything other than Democratic Party, Republican Party, or Other, with the "Other" option having a blank line and no instructions on how to register as something else.

Voter registration statistics

Historical district maps

Recent presidential elections

List of members representing the district

Election results

1930s

1932

1934

1936

1938

1940s

1940

1942

1944

1946

1948

1950s

1950

1952

1954

1956

1958

1960s

1960

1962

1964

1966

1968

1970s

1970

1972

1974

1976

1978

1980s

1980

1982

1984

1986

1988

1990s

1990

1992

1994

1996

1998

2000s

2000

2002

2004

2006

2008

2010s

2010

2012

2014

2016

2018

2020s

2020

2022

See also

Kentucky's congressional districts
List of United States congressional districts

References
Specific

General
 
 
 Congressional Biographical Directory of the United States 1774–present

See also
United States House of Representatives elections, 2006

03
Government of Louisville, Kentucky
Jefferson County, Kentucky
Constituencies established in 1803
1803 establishments in Kentucky
Constituencies disestablished in 1933
1933 disestablishments in Kentucky
Constituencies established in 1935
1935 establishments in Kentucky